Fire Station No. 2 is a fire station located at 2701 S Tacoma Avenue in Tacoma, Washington. The Art Deco building was designed by architect Salas E. Nelson and built by Knoell Brothers in 1907. It was listed on the National Register of Historic Places on May 2, 1986 as part of the thematic resource, "Historic Fire Stations of Tacoma, Washington".

See also
 Historic preservation
 National Register of Historic Places listings in Pierce County, Washington

References

External links
 * 
 

Art Deco architecture in Washington (state)
Buildings and structures in Tacoma, Washington
Fire stations completed in 1907
Fire stations on the National Register of Historic Places in Washington (state)
National Register of Historic Places in Tacoma, Washington